Conversion to Christianity is the religious conversion of a previously non-Christian person to Christianity. Different Christian denominations may perform various different kinds of rituals or ceremonies of initiation into their community of believers. The most commonly accepted ritual of conversion in Christianity is through baptism, but this is not universally accepted among them all. A period of instruction and study almost always ensues before a person is formally converted into Christianity and becomes a church member, but the length of this period varies, sometimes as short as a few weeks and possibly less, and other times, up to as long as a year or possibly more.

Most mainline Christian denominations will accept conversion into other denominations as valid, so long as a baptism with water in the name of the Trinity took place, but some may accept a simple profession of faith in Jesus as Lord as being all that was needed for true conversion. Other Christians may not accept conversions performed in other denominations and certain communities may be discriminated against as heretical. This is true for many nontrinitarian sects, which many mainstream Christian denominations (Catholic, Orthodox, and Protestant) reject as having valid forms of conversion. Consequently, many nontrinitarian sects spiritually isolate themselves in that they may only consider their conversions valid and not those of mainstream Christianity.

Social scientists have shown great interest in the Christian conversion as a religious experience that believers describe as strengthening their faith and changing their lives. Christianization, defined as the "reformulation of social relations, cultural meanings, and personal experience in terms of (commonly accepted or supposed) Christian ideals", should be distinguished from conversion. Christianization is the broader cultural term, and typically has involved efforts to systematically convert an entire continent or culture from existing beliefs to Christianity.

Methods of conversion

Introduction
Christian denominations vary on the exact procedures of conversion. More traditional Christian groups such as the Catholic Church, the Eastern Orthodox Church, Lutherans, Anglicans, Methodists, and some Reformed Christians consider the sacrament of baptism in the name of the Trinity to be the moment of conversion. All of these groups teach the doctrine of baptismal regeneration, that is, once baptized, all past sins, including original sin, are washed away and a person becomes justified before God. Through baptism, one is incorporated into the body of believers, called the Church, and may rightly be considered a Christian. Some of these groups may also administer other sacraments in the process of conversion such as confirmation. Some Evangelical Christians, like Baptist, and Pentecostals, do not believe baptism is necessary for salvation and conversion, but only that a profession of faith is enough. Christians also differ on how old someone must be to convert. More traditional groups of Christians believe conversion is not restricted to age, and tend to baptize infants.

Instructions
Before conversion takes place, converts, also called "catechumens", must undergo a period of instruction. In the Catholic Church,  this usually involves spending a few months preparing in RCIA (Rite of Christian Initiation of Adults), where catechumens spend time learning about the Christian faith and the teachings of the Bible and the Church. In the Orthodox Church, it can take up to a full year of studying and participation before one is baptized. Protestant denominations and other Christian groups have various other ways of instructing converts which may focus heavily on the Bible.

Baptism/Confirmation
 
There are different modes of baptism in Christianity, these include immersion, affusion (pouring), and aspersion (sprinkling). The way in which a person is baptized depends on the denomination one enters. Almost all baptisms share in common the use of the Trinitarian formula (in the name of the Father, Son, and Holy Spirit) by the minister while baptizing the convert. The Roman Catholic Church primarily baptizes with affusion but occasionally does so with immersion. Orthodox Christians and some Eastern Catholics baptize by triple immersion upon invocation of the Trinity; the only time the Orthodox Church permits other forms of baptism is in the case of an emergency.

Protestants baptize in a number of different ways. Many Anglicans and Lutherans baptize by affusion, whereas Presbyterians and Congregationalists typically baptize with aspersion. Others, like Methodists, may conduct all three forms of baptism. Many Evangelical Protestants insist that only full immersion baptism is valid, basing this on the New Testament Greek word for baptism "baptizo" (βαπτίζω) which can be translated as "dipping" or "submersion."

Depending on which of these denominations one enters, the sacrament of Confirmation, also known as Chrismation by eastern Christians, may be immediately administered after the baptism. In the Latin Catholic Church, infants who are baptized are not confirmed, but instead must wait until they're in their teens to be confirmed. In the Eastern Orthodox Church, and many Eastern Catholic Churches, infants are Chrismated and communed by a priest or bishop immediately after they are baptized. When an adult convert enters the Catholic or Orthodox Church, they are immediately confirmed after baptism, upon which, a clergy member will anoint the forehead with olive oil (or in the case of Byzantine Christians, the forehead, eyes, nostrils, mouth, ears, breast, hands, and feet), calling upon the Holy Spirit to seal the convert with his gifts. After confirmation ensues, the convert is invited to partake of first communion. These rites usually occur on Easter Vigil.

Persons who convert to most mainline Protestant groups will be received via baptism and be initiated further by any traditions the particular denomination holds to.

Oneness Pentecostals baptize converts by full immersion in the name of Jesus alone, a departure from the usual form of baptism. They base this off of certain passages found in the Acts of the Apostles. Unlike most Pentecostals, Oneness Pentecostals believe baptism is necessary for salvation. Although they do not baptize infants, stressing that conversion is a personal decision.

The Church of Jesus Christ of Latter-day Saints (LDS Church) teach that baptism is the first sacrament, called an ordinance in LDS theology, following conversion and is required for membership in the LDS Church. Baptism, according to the LDS theology, requires that the convert be accountable (credobaptism), that it be by immersion, and that it be performed by an authorized priesthood holder. As the LDS Church does not recognize the priesthood authority of other churches, all converts, even those from other Christian denominations, are required to be baptized. Following baptism, a convert is confirmed a member of the LDS Church and receives the Gift of the Holy Ghost by the laying on of hands of a Melchizedek Priesthood holder.

Lutheranism

In Lutheranism, conversion or regeneration in the strict sense of the term is the work of divine grace and power by which man, born of the flesh, and void of all power to think, to will, or to do any good thing, and dead in sin is, through the gospel and holy baptism, taken from a state of sin and wrath and spiritual death into a state of spiritual life of faith and grace, rendered able to will and to do what is spiritually good and, especially, made actually to accept the benefits of the redemption which is in Christ Jesus.

Anabaptism

The majority of Seekers are young adults seeking membership in Old Order Anabaptist Christian denominations value "Having a strong community, being serious about following the Bible and leading a Christian life and a commitment to modesty".

The Beachy Amish, many of whom conduct their services in English and allow for a limited range of modern conveniences, regularly receive seekers into their churches as visitors, and eventually, as members. Becoming a member involves a proving period and a study of the Dordrecht Confession of Faith (1633).

Evangelical Christianity
Evangelical Protestants do not consider baptism to be necessary for salvation. Because of this, instead of baptism, a person becomes a Christian the moment they profess Jesus as their Lord and Savior. Evangelicals base this off of their interpretation of certain verses in the Bible. 

This may be expressed at some Evangelical church services where the Pastor may conduct an "altar call", inviting non-Christian persons to go up publicly and "receive" Jesus into their hearts to become Christian.

As a result of this belief, many Evangelicals do not practice infant baptism and from this they profess one must be able to make the decision on their own to convert to Christianity; other Evangelicals, such as Methodists, practice infant baptism as a celebration of prevenient grace. Nevertheless, all Evangelicals recognize the form of believer's baptism as a public pronouncement of faith in Christ.

Conversion from other religions 
According to a 2001 study by professor David B. Barrett of Columbia University and historian George Thomas Kurian, approximately 2.7 million people were converting to Christianity annually from another religion, while approximately 3.8 million people were converting annually according to The Oxford Handbook of Religious Conversion. Pentecostalism is the fastest growing religion in the world; this growth is primarily due to religious conversion from non-Christian religions and Christians switching denominations.

According to scholar Philip Jenkins, Christianity is growing rapidly in China, other Asian countries, and sub-Saharan Africa. According to a study by a scholar Fenggang Yang from Purdue University, Christianity is "spreading among the Chinese of South-East Asia", and "Evangelical and Pentecostal Christianity is growing more quickly in China"; more than half of them have university degrees. According to a report by the Singapore Management University, an increasing number of people in Southeast Asia are converting to Christianity, and these new converts are mostly Chinese business managers. According to scholar Juliette Koning and Heidi Dahles of Vrije Universiteit Amsterdam, there is a "rapid expansion of charismatic Christianity from the 1980s onwards. Singapore, China, Hong Kong, Taiwan, Indonesia, and Malaysia are said to have the fastest-growing Christian communities and the majority of the new believers are "upwardly mobile, urban, middle-class Chinese". Asia has the second largest community of Charismatic Christians (including Pentecostal Christians) of any continent, with the number growing from 10 million to 135 million between 1970 and 2000". According to the Council on Foreign Relations, the "number of Chinese Protestants has grown by an average of 10 percent annually since 1979". According to scholar Todd Hartch of Eastern Kentucky University, by 2005, around 6 million Africans were converting annually to Christianity. While the exact number of Dalit converts to Christianity in India is not available, scholar William R. Burrow of Colorado State University estimated that about 8% of Dalits have converted to Christianity. According to a 2021 study by the Pew Research Center, Christianity grew in India due to conversion; most of these converts are former Hindus, though some are former Muslims.

According to the historian Geoffrey Blainey from the University of Melbourne, since the 1960s, there has been a substantial increase in the number of conversions from Islam to Christianity, mostly to the Evangelical and Pentecostal traditions of Christianity. The 2015 study Believers in Christ from a Muslim Background: A Global Census estimated that 10.2 million Muslims converted to Christianity. Countries with the largest numbers of Muslims converted to Christianity include Indonesia (6,500,000), Nigeria (600,000), Iran (500,000 versus only 500 in 1979), the United States (450,000), Ethiopia (400,000), and Algeria (380,000). Indonesia is home to the largest Christian community made up of converts from their former Islamic faith; since the mid and late 1960s, between 2–2.5 million Muslims converted to Christianity.

Conversion between denominations
Most denominations accept one's baptism performed by another denomination. Nearly always, the baptism must have been with water and performed in the name of the Trinity. Such converts are usually received by a formal rite which normally also includes taking communion in the denomination and possibly being confirmed. The similarity of belief necessary for acceptance of a baptism under a different denomination is called "Like Faith and Practice" or sometimes "Right Method, Right Medium, Right Meaning".

Catholicism

The Catholic Church considers all forms of baptism with water, including full immersion, affusion, and aspersion, that are done in the name of the Trinity as valid.

Protestants (Lutherans, Moravians, Anglicans, Presbyterians, Baptists, Assemblies of God, Methodists, etc.) who convert to Catholicism are usually not baptized, but instead are asked to make a simple profession of faith at Mass on an ordinary Sunday. Confirmation usually follows (though not always), and the convert proceeds to receive first communion.

Eastern Christians (Eastern Orthodox, Oriental Orthodox, and Assyrians), are only asked to make a simple profession of faith and then begin participation in the Eucharist without having to be confirmed due to the Catholic Church recognizing eastern Christian sacraments. Eastern Christians who convert to the Catholic Church are automatically enrolled into the eastern rite corresponding to the Church they originated from regardless of what  Church they entered the Catholic Church through.

The amount of instruction before reception varies depending on how active the person has been in their Christian life, and how informed they are about the faith. Validly baptized persons coming from previous denominations do not have to be enrolled in RCIA because the Church does not consider them catechumens since their baptism has already made them Christians. Private instructions may be given by a priest, which can last from a few weeks to a few months at most. After instructions have ensued, the person may be asked to pick a sponsor for confirmation if the pastor decides to perform the sacrament.

Mormons, Jehovah's Witnesses, Oneness Pentecostals, Christadelphians, Christian Scientist, and other groups who hold to nontrinitarianism and/or who do not baptize in the "proper" Trinitarian formula are received into the Catholic Church through baptism due to the Catholic Church not recognizing nontrinitarian baptisms. Quakers and members of the Salvation Army are also baptized because neither church practices baptism.

Converts into any of the Eastern Catholic Churches, 23 sui juris Churches in full communion with the Bishop of Rome, are usually received by the traditions of that particular Church.

Eastern Orthodoxy
In the Eastern Orthodox Churches there are different opinions held by bishops and theologians on how to receive Christians coming from other denominations. Some will only accept Eastern Orthodox baptism done by triple immersion, and thus will rebaptize all converts. Generally, most jurisdictions will accept baptism done in another denomination by economy, as long as it has been done with water in the name of the Trinity; this is the position held by the Ecumenical Patriarchate of Constantinople. Most converts from other Christian denominations with baptisms in the Trinitarian formula (Catholics, Protestants, Oriental Orthodox, Assyrians) are received by chrismation and a profession of faith. Specifically, those who are baptized in the Oriental Orthodox, Roman Catholic, Lutheran, Old Catholic, Moravian, Anglican, Methodist, Reformed, Presbyterian, Brethren, Assemblies of God, or Baptist traditions can be received into the Orthodox Church through the sacrament of Chrismation. Confirmations of non-Eastern Orthodox Churches are not ordinarily deemed valid by the Eastern Orthodox Churches. 

Some Eastern Orthodox groups, such as the Russian Orthodox Church Outside of Russia (ROCOR), a semi-autonomous part of the Russian Orthodox Church since 2007, chooses to rebaptize all converts to Orthodoxy including Protestants and Catholics as well as most Oriental Orthodox. Since ROCOR is a fully canonical part of the Eastern Orthodox Church, Orthodox Christians who converted from another Christian denomination without being baptized again, but were received simply by chrismation or confession in their respective jurisdiction, are still communed by ROCOR clergy since Orthodox are not to doubt the validity of someone's conversion to the Orthodox faith.

The Eastern Orthodox Church baptizes all Christians coming from nontrinitarian denominations, such as the LDS Church, because the Eastern Orthodox Church does not consider nontrinitarian baptisms as valid.

Oriental Orthodoxy
Oriental Orthodox reception of converts from other Christian denominations varies greatly. The Coptic Orthodox Church accepts all baptisms done in the Eastern Orthodox Church, and since April 2017, accepts those baptisms done in the Roman Catholic Church. The Armenian Apostolic, the Syriac Orthodox Church, and the Malankara Orthodox Church are generally willing to accept any baptism done with water in the name of the Trinity.

Protestantism
Most mainline Protestant groups hold that baptism performed with water in the name of the Trinity is valid and will accept converts who had been baptized within a previous Christian denominations in accordance with their particular customs.

Some Evangelical groups like Baptists and Pentecostals do not consider baptism done by sprinkling or pouring as valid and might rebaptize a convert from another denomination by full immersion.

Others
Mormons do not recognize baptisms done in Christian denominations and will rebaptize using the Trinitarian formula (although they reject the orthodox doctrine of the Trinity) and confirm converts.

Oneness Pentecostals only accept baptism done in the name of Jesus, and subsequently, baptize converts from previous denominations who were not previously baptized in this particular formula.

Jehovah's Witnesses baptize all converts including those already baptized in previous denominations.

Examples from the New Testament 

The conversion of the Apostle Peter, as recorded in the Bible,  serves as a classic example of "a previously non-Christian person entering upon the Christian way of life":

The Gospels speak of the coming of the Kingdom with power from on high and while Jesus was alive on earth he was still under the Jewish Law being obedient to its rules and regulations. Jesus though was given all authority in heaven and on earth, even the authority to forgive sins which before only God could do. While alive on the cross he did forgive the thief who asked him because he had that authority. In , Jesus' last command was for his disciples to go and make disciples of all nations, baptizing them in the name of the Father and of the Son and of the Holy Spirit, and teaching them to obey everything he had commanded.

In  we see the start of the Christian church with the Holy Spirit coming down, and Peter preaching to the crowd about how their sins, along with the help of wicked men, crucified the savior. Their response was "what shall we do?" Peter's response to their faith was, “Repent and be baptized, every one of you, in the name of Jesus Christ for the forgiveness of your sins. And you will receive the gift of the Holy Spirit. The promise is for you and your children and for all who are far off—for all whom the Lord our God will call.”

Another dramatic conversion to Christianity occurred in the life of the Apostle Paul whose formal name had been Saul of Tarsus. He was a zealot for the cause of Second Temple Judaism who had been "breathing threats and murder against the disciples of the Lord". While traveling to Damascus to arrest Jewish Christians, he fell to the ground upon being surrounded by a bright light "from heaven". He heard a voice accusing him: "Saul, Saul, why are you persecuting me?" The experience rendered him temporarily blind. The voice directed him to go on to Damascus where he was cured and baptized by Ananias of Damascus, was described as being filled with the Holy Spirit, and began to passionately proclaim the Christian gospel (good news).

In the book of Romans there is a description of what transpires through water baptism. We died to sin; how can we live in it any longer? (repentance) Or don’t you know that all of us who were baptized into Christ Jesus were baptized into his death? We were therefore buried with him through baptism into death in order that, just as Christ was raised from the dead through the glory of the Father, we too may live a new life. (Being immersed in water through baptism is like Jesus being buried in the tomb and being brought up out of the water is like Jesus' resurrection to a new life, i.e., born again by water and Spirit)

Hanigan perceives a common "death and rebirth" experience in these and other conversions which he describes as "encounters with the living God". His analysis is that these individuals responded not so much out of a sense of guilt, but from their awe, reverence, and holy fear of God's presence. The pattern, he writes, begins with God taking initiative in the individual's life. Then, the person responds by acknowledging and confessing personal lostness and sinfulness, and then accepting a call to holiness.

See also

 Christianization
 Conversion of the Jews
 Credo
 Engel Scale
 Forced conversion
 List of converts to Christianity
 Rite of Christian Initiation for Adults (RCIA)

References